Louis' Shoes is a 2020 French animated short film directed by Marion Philippe, Kayu Leung, Théo Jamin and Jean-Géraud Blanc  and produced by Anne Brotot with MoPA 3D School. The short has been presented in a number of festivals including in Clermont-Ferrand Festival, DOK Leipzig and won awards in 2021 in Stuttgart Trickfilm International Animated Film Festival, Student Academy Awards, and a Gold Medal in Best Animation International category.

Plot 
Louis,  years old, is autistic. He arrives at his new school and is about to introduce himself.

Accolades 
Since its launch, the film has been selected in various festivals and academies around the world: 

The short was part of the world touring screening The Animation Showcase 2021.

References

External links 
 Louis' Shoes on Vimeo
 Louis' Shoes on YouTube
Siggraph Spotlight Podcast 
Louis' Shoes Website

2020 films
2020s French-language films
Films about autism
Films set in schools
French animated short films
French children's films
French drama short films
2020s French films